This is a discography of the band Strawbs.

Albums

Studio albums

Live albums

Compilation albums

Singles

Video albums

Notes

References

External links
http://www.strawbsweb.co.uk/
 

Discographies of British artists